The High Dials are a Canadian indie rock band from Montreal, Quebec, Canada. The band started out playing a brand of pop music strongly influenced by 1960s British mod styles, but their sound has broadened to incorporate power pop, psychedelic music, shoegaze and folk rock.

History
The High Dials evolved out of an earlier three-piece band known as The Datsons. The Datsons released music on Union Label Group affiliate Tyrant Records in 2000  and Off the Hip Records in 2002 as "The Datson Four". 
  Confusion with New Zealand band The Datsuns and a new sound and line-up resulted in a name change following SXSW 2003.

The High Dials' debut album, A New Devotion, was released July 29, 2003 through Rainbow Quartz Records. Described as a concept album about "a boy named Silas attempting to escape from a nightmarish city of the future", it reached the top ten of the !earshot National Top 50 Chart. E Street Band guitarist and radio personality Little Steven Van Zandt played the album on his Sirius radio show, and later booked them to perform at his 2004 Underground Garage Festival in NYC,<ref>"Review – Little Steven’s Underground Garage Festival". David Sprague, Variety”, August 15, 2004</ref> which featured The Strokes, Stooges and New York Dolls.

2004 saw the band release a follow-up EP - Fields In Glass - featuring album outtakes and electro remixes by Michael Musmanno, Davy Love and Will Carruthers. Exclaim! likened the sound to a mix of Chemical Brothers and Robert Pollard.

In 2005, the High Dials released their sophomore album War of the Wakening Phantoms, which marked a departure from the overtly retro feel of their first album. Produced by Joseph Donovan and mixed by David Bianco, the songs featured lusher, more varied instrumentation and Sam Roberts as a guest violinist.  The new direction in sound was generally well received by critics, with the album dubbed a ‘latter-day psychedelic classic' by NME. It reached the number one spot on Canadian college radio charts. The High Dials toured in support of the album, including support act slots for Brian Jonestown Massacre and Neko Case.

The album was followed by The Holy Ground EP in 2007, which featured a guest appearance by Rod Argent of The Zombies on keyboard.

The High Dials released the album Moon Country independently in 2008, before returning to Rainbow Quartz Records in 2010 for Anthems for Doomed Youth. The latter album enjoyed airplay from  KROQ DJ Rodney Bingenheimer. Album track “Bedroom Shadows”, featured in the SyFy series Being Human.

Notable High Dials' concerts in this period include supporting Echo & the Bunnymen at SXSW  and the Osheaga Music Festival in Montreal, 2011. Later in 2011, they worked with original Rolling Stones manager Andrew Loog Oldham on a cover of “She Smiled Sweetly” for The Andrew Oldham Orchestra and Friends Pay The Rolling Stones Songbook Vol. 2.

Following two teaser EPs - Yestergraves (2013) and Desert Tribe (2014) - the High Dials released In the A.M. Wilds on February 3, 2015, each co-produced by Marc Bell. The album marked another stage in the band's evolution with its post-punk influences and pulsing "electronic shimmer", though these sounds had previously been noted by critics on 2008's Moon Country. Album track "Echoes and Empty Rooms" featured in season four of the Netflix series House of Cards.

Following its release, the band toured Mexico and Colombia for the first time.

In November 2018, the band returned from hiatus with the Foreverish EP and video.

Members
The High Dials have had a fluctuating line-up since 2003, centered on founding members Trevor Anderson and Robbie MacArthur. Band members have included drummer George Donoso III (ex- The Dears) keyboardist and backing vocalist Eric Dougherty, drummer Max Hebert, bassist/sitarist Rishi Dhir and Robb Surridge (drums). MacArthur is also a member of Montreal-based The Besnard Lakes.

Discography

EPsFields in Glass EP (2004)The Holy Ground EP (2007)Yestergraves EP (2013)Desert Tribe EP (2014)Foreverish EP (2018)

Albums
 A New Devotion (2003)
 War of the Wakening Phantoms (2005)
 Moon Country (2008)
 Anthems for Doomed Youth (2010)
 In the A.M. Wilds (2015)
 Primitive Feelings, Pt. 1'' (2019)

See also

Canadian rock
List of bands from Canada

References

External links
 The High Dials official site

Musical groups established in 2003
Canadian indie rock groups
Canadian power pop groups
Musical groups from Montreal
English-language musical groups from Quebec
Canadian psychedelic rock music groups
Psychedelic pop music groups